Flow Separation is a red and white, marbled repainting of the John J. Harvey fireboat by artist Tauba Auerbach. The project was a collaboration with the Public Art Fund and 14-18 NOW, a British centenary arts program that has sponsored ship repaintings in the spirit of World War I dazzle camouflage.

Further reading 

 
 
 
 
 
 
 
 
 http://www.artnews.com/2018/12/27/year-beyond-new-yorks-galleries-plus-top-10/

External links 

 

2018 works
Kickstarter-funded artworks
Public Art Fund works